Sometimes You See It Coming is a novel by Kevin Baker.  The novel follows several fictitious members of the modern-day New York Mets, particularly right fielder John Barr.  The book portrays the Mets as a perennial pennant contender, and follows the team through one particular season, with flashbacks.

Characters
Mets

C Spock Feeley
1B No-Hit Hitt
2B Roberto Rodriguez (aka Bobby Roddy)
SS Lonnie Lee
3B Terry White/Stillwater Norman
LF Maximillian Duke (aka The Emp'ror)
CF Rapid Ricky Falls (aka The Old Swizzlehead)
RF John Barr

Pitchers
Moses Yellowhorse

Coaches
MGR Charlie Stanzi (aka The Little Maniac)
Coach Plate

Press Corps
Barry Busby
Ellie Jay

Others
Evan Barr (John's father)
Wanda Falls (Ricky's wife)

Reception
Publishers Weekly noted that while the book had a predictable ending and "uneven", awkward writing, Baker had "an undeniable feel" for the interactions between the baseball players, and was capable of "flashes of quick wit". Kirkus Reviews stated that while the book was "baseball as it's meant to be", Barr's backstory was "somber, overripe [...] Freudian glop" that did not fit the theme.

References

1993 American novels
American sports novels
Baseball novels
New York Mets
Novels set in New York City